Burkholderia territorii is a bacterium from the genus of Burkholderia. Burkholderia territorii belongs to the Burkholderia cepacia complex.

References

External links
Type strain of Burkholderia territorii at BacDive -  the Bacterial Diversity Metadatabase

Further reading
 

Burkholderiaceae
Bacteria described in 2015